Drenik is a small settlement in the Municipality of Škofljica in central Slovenia. It lies in the hills east of Pijava Gorica. The entire municipality is part of the traditional region of Lower Carniola and is now included in the Central Slovenia Statistical Region.

Name
Drenik was attested in historical sources as Renn in 1321, Drenek in 1370, Dregkch in 1431, and Drëkg and Drenaw in 1436, among other spellings.

References

External links

Drenik on Geopedia

Populated places in the Municipality of Škofljica